Gone Are the Days is a 2018 American Western film directed by Mark Landre Gould and starring Lance Henriksen, Tom Berenger, Meg Steedle and Danny Trejo.  It is Gould's feature directorial debut.

Cast
Lance Henriksen as Taylon Flynn
Billy Lush as Virgil
Danny Trejo as River Man
Steve Railsback as Jaden
Meg Steedle as Heidi
Tom Berenger as Sheriff Will
Lulu Wilson as Sally Anne
Jamie McShane as Doctor Jenkins
Carter Hastings as Jonathan
Jackson Dunn as Henry

Release
The film was released on Blu-ray and digital platforms on April 10, 2018.

References

External links
 
 

American Western (genre) films
2010s English-language films
2010s American films